Beatragus is a genus of  alcelaphine antelope. The hirola (Beatragus hunteri) is the only living representative, but a couple of extinct species are known, all from Africa.

The hirola and the larger Beatragus antiquus may together represent different phases of a chronospecies; the living hirola probably declined in size as a result of an ecologically impoverished landscape.

References

Mammal genera
Mammal genera with one living species
Alcelaphinae
Mammals described in 1912